This is a list of Ohio Bobcats football players in the NFL Draft.

Key

Selections

References

Ohio

Ohio Bobcats NFL Draft